Communauté d'agglomération du Centre Littoral is an intercommunal structure, centred on the city of Cayenne. It is located in the French Guiana overseas department and region of France. It was created in January 2012. Its seat is in Cayenne. Its area is 5086.9 km2. Its population was 138,920 in 2017, of which 61,268 in Cayenne proper.

Composition
The communauté d'agglomération consists of the following 6 communes:
Cayenne
Macouria
Matoury
Montsinéry-Tonnegrande
Remire-Montjoly
Roura

References

Centre Littoral
Centre Littoral